Concrete is the University of East Anglia's student newspaper. Concrete is free and published fortnightly on a Tuesday, during term time.

Concrete is compiled by a team of around thirty editorial team members and headed by the Editor-in-Chief and their Deputies. It is distributed throughout campus fortnightly as a free pickup newspaper and online via their website.

Concrete is part of the UEA Media Collective, which also includes the student radio station Livewire and UEA:TV.

Concrete's logo was redesigned in the 2019/20 year to include its new motto, "Striving for Truth". The logo was set on a new background of colours, each of which represents a section of the newspaper.

Concrete's sections include News, Global, Features and Interview, Comment, Science, Travel & Lifestyle, and Sport, plus an editorial page and a 'Home of the Wonderful' section (called 'Hey UEA' until 2019) rounding up Media Collective and campus news from social media. Sections are each between two and four pages long.

Inside Concrete is Venue, a 24-page culture supplement which includes Arts, Books, Fashion, Creative Writing, Music, Gaming, Film, and TV.

Previous issues have included interviews with Tony Blair, Nick Clegg, Clive Lewis, Paul McCartney, Bernard Hill, Coldplay, Stephen Fry, Wolf Alice, Michael Palin, Harrison Ford, Joey Essex, Charles Clarke, Lord Deben, Max Mosley, Paul Hunter and Greg James. Concrete also publishes its famous annual sex survey, plus an annual Derby Day pull-out when UEA's sports teams face the University of Essex.

History 
Concrete was first published on January 22, 1992, continuing a tradition of student media at UEA that included Phoenix and Insight. There was also an earlier short-lived magazine called Concrete in the 1970s, whose logo was adapted by the newspaper in a redesign in 1997. The paper was originally set up independently of both the University and student union, though with the support of the School of English and American Studies. It became part of the UEA Students' Union in 1995, and formally became a Union society in 2001. It is therefore funded and published by the UEA Students' Union, with writers and editors paying nominal subs. Advertising is also co-ordinated by the Students' Union, however the newspaper retains editorial independence.

Concrete was unusual among UK student newspapers in having a full-time paid student editor who was not a sabbatical officer of the student union. However, in 2012 this system was discontinued and the job became a part-time unpaid position alongside academic studies. Other senior editorial positions were created on a flexible basis to help alleviate the responsibilities, including Online Editor.

On September 29, 1993, Concrete launched a standalone entertainment supplement called The Event which was offered for sale off-campus. The last standalone edition of The Event was published on March 2, 1994 but the brand was retained. It was replaced by Venue in 2010 which continues as a separate, pull-out magazine inside the paper today.

Past editors and contributors have had notable careers in the media, including Polly Graham, who was a founding member of the Daily Mirror newspaper's The 3am Girls gossip column, and Katie Hind, who was The People's showbiz editor. Many alumni have gone into jobs with local newspaper group Archant.

Concrete'''s achievements were recognised in 1995 by The Guardian newspaper and the National Union of Students and shortlisted by both in the 'Student Newspaper of the Year' category. By the time of Concretes fiftieth issue, it was being read by 98% of students at UEA.

Since September 2019 Concrete has run the Concrete Mental Health Crisis campaign to promote wellbeing on campus. This followed four student deaths in the space of ten months at UEA. A number of prominent figures have added their names to the campaign, including Stephen Fry, Sir Norman Lamb, Gina Miller, Steve Brine and Clive Lewis. The campaign is also supported by the mother of a student who took his own life while at UEA as well as the University's Vice-Chancellor. By May 2020 UEA launched an opt-in scheme allowing the University to inform a specified person if they have any concerns about the student's welfare, a key aim of Concrete's campaign. The campaign's articles and social media posts have been viewed more than 266,000 times online.Concrete's website was redesigned prior to the 2012/13 academic year. Concrete often operates a live feed for Derby Day on its website and via social media. The 2019 Derby Day feed garnered almost 5,000 views.Concrete has previously published annual drugs surveys, house-hunting guides and one-off creative writing supplements with Venue. There was a short-lived Finance section in the main paper in the year 2017/18. The following year it was replaced by the 'Hey UEA' section, which became the 'Home of the Wonderful' section for Media Collective news.

 Awards 
 1995 The Guardian / NUS Student Media Awards – Winner, Newspaper of the Year
 2000 The Independent / NUS National Student Journalism Awards - Winner, Best Newspaper 
 2000 The Guardian Student Media Awards – Nominated, Newspaper of the Year 
 2000 The Guardian Student Media Awards – Nominated, Feature Writer of the Year - Stephen Collins 
 2000 The Guardian Student Media Awards – Nominated, Sports Writer of the Year - Nick Henegan 
 2001 The Independent / NUS National Student Journalism Awards – Runner-Up, Best Newspaper 
 2002 The Independent / NUS National Student Journalism Awards – Nominated, Best Reporter - Katie Hind
 2002 The Independent / NUS National Student Journalism Awards – Nominated, Best Arts Journalist - Charlotte Ronalds
 2003 The Guardian Student Media Awards – Nominated, Feature Writer of the Year - Jo Locke
 2003 The Guardian Student Media Awards – Nominated, Newspaper of the Year 
 2003 The Guardian Student Media Awards – Nominated, Feature Writer of the Year - Nathan Dixon
 2004 The Guardian Student Media Awards – Nominated, Magazine of the Year - The Event supplement 
 2005 The Guardian Student Media Awards – Winner, Travel Writer - Robert Castell 
2018 BBC Radio 4 Today Student Journalism Awards – Nominated, Best Publication 
2019 BBC Radio 4 Today Student Journalism Awards – Runner-Up, Best Publication 
2019 BBC Radio 4 Today'' Student Journalism Awards – Winner, Best Programme 
2020 Amnesty Media Awards – Nominated, Student Journalist of the Year - William Warnes 
2020 SPA Awards - nominated for seven awards in 2020, including Best Publication).
2022 SPA Awards - Shortlisted for Best Science Section, Best Sports Section, Best Sports Reporter (Oscar Ress), Best Interview (Dolly Carter), Outstanding Commitment (Dolly Carter), Best Reporter (Dolly Carter), and Best Publication

References

External links 
 ''Concrete'''s website

University of East Anglia
Student newspapers published in the United Kingdom
Biweekly newspapers published in the United Kingdom
Newspapers published in Norfolk
Free newspapers
Publications established in 1992